Chicago Military Academy-Bronzeville is a public four-year military high school located in the Bronzeville neighborhood located on the South Side of Chicago, Illinois, in a building known as the Eighth Regiment Armory. The academy opened on August 24, 1999. The academy includes a mandatory Junior Reserve Officers' Training Corps (JROTC) instructional component in addition to a four-year college preparatory curriculum.

Academics
Chicago Military Academy-Bronzeville is a High School that offers many academic departments. Some of these courses are offered through the Advancement Via Individual Determination (AVID) school, Advanced Placement (AP) courses, honors courses, Computer Science, Fine Arts, Foreign Languages, IVHS, etc.

Athletics

Football
Soccer
Volleyball
Basketball
Baseball
Fencing

Activities

National Honor Society
Academic Decathlon
Principal’s Scholars
Beta Club
Debate and Speech Team
Math Club

Service Organizations

School Band
Drum and Bugle Corps
Cadet Board
Peer Leaders
Community Service Club
Student Council

Special Interest Organizations

Chess Club
Big Brother/Big Sisters
Bowling Club

Notable alumni
Stephanie Coleman (class of 2006) – Politician, City of Chicago alderman (16th ward).

References

External links

1999 establishments in Illinois
Educational institutions established in 1999
Military high schools in the United States
Public high schools in Chicago